Host is the fourth studio album by American indie pop band Cults, released on September 18, 2020, by Sinderlyn.

Reception

Host received generally favorable reviews from several mainstream critic websites. At Metacritic, which assigns a normalized rating out of 100 to reviews from mainstream critics, the album has received an average score of 75 out of 100, which indicates "Generally Favorable Reviews," based on 7 reviews.

Track listing
Music and lyrics by Madeline Follin and Brian Oblivion. Produced by Cults and Shane Stoneback.

Personnel
 Cults
 Madeline Follin – vocals, production
 Brian Oblivion – vocals, guitar, bass, keyboards, production
 Shane Stoneback – production

References

External links
Official Website

2020 albums
Cults (band) albums